Dan Farber (born 23 January 1987) is an Israeli record producer and songwriter. In the 2000s he performed as a rapper under the stage name Metro. His most notable collaborations include working with Subliminal, Lizzo, Dizzee Rascal, Sarit Hadad and Tkay Maidza.

Early life 
Farber was born in 1987 in Tel Aviv, Israel and raised in Los Angeles.

Musical career 
Farber began his musical career in the 2000s as a rapper, songwriter and record producer. In 2005 he signed a deal with Subliminal's TACT Family, producing albums released by the label, including Subliminal's Jew-Niversal and The Shadow's debut Lo Sam Zain, among others. In 2010, Farber released two singles was supposed to be included on his debut album, "BeToch Bu'ah" and "Mishak Shel Dma'ot". The singles have not been successful and the album shelved due to controversy with the record label.

In 2014 he released his debut extended play Middle Eastern Jungle by Dim Mak Records. That year, Farber signed a record deal with Borgore's Buygore, releasing some singles by the label and co-writing Borgore's tracks. In 2015, he produced the debut album by Yael Borger, Borgore's sister.

In July 2017, Farber co-produced the sixth studio album by British rapper Dizzee Rascal Raskit, that reached the tenth place in the UK Albums Chart. That year, he signed a record deal with Atlantic Records.

In July 2019, Farber co-produced the gold record by Lizzo "Tempo", the second single from her Grammy Award-winning studio album Cuz I Love You.

Personal life 
Farber lives in Los Angeles.

Discography

Extended plays 
 Middle Eastern Jungle (2014)

References 

Israeli hip hop record producers
Israeli male songwriters
Israeli electronic musicians
Israeli rappers
Atlantic Records artists
Dim Mak Records artists
1987 births
Living people